"Natural Born Bugie" is the debut single released in 1969 by English rock band Humble Pie, who were one of the first British supergroups. It was written as a mid tempo rock song by Steve Marriott,  for Andrew Loog Oldham's Immediate label and became the band's first single release. The original UK B-side was "Wrist Job" and it was replaced with "I'll Go Alone" for a later release in United States. The three guitarists sang a verse each.

The song reached No. 4 in the UK Singles Chart during 1969. The song's refrain refers to a "Natural Born Woman".

Personnel

"Natural Born Bugie"
Steve Marriott - vocals, rhythm guitar, Wurlitzer electric piano
Peter Frampton - vocals, lead guitar 
Greg Ridley - vocals, bass guitar
Jerry Shirley - drums

"Wrist Job"
Steve Marriott - vocals, Wurlitzer electric piano
Peter Frampton - backing vocals, Hammond organ
Greg Ridley - backing vocals, bass guitar
Jerry Shirley - drums

Charts

References

1969 debut singles
Humble Pie (band) songs
Songs written by Steve Marriott
Immediate Records singles
1969 songs